Big Beautiful Tour was a concert tour in by American R&B recording artist Jill Scott, in support of her album Beautifully Human: Words and Sounds Vol. 2. The tour started on February 9, and ended on March 26, in Upper Darby, PA. Scott's performance received rave reviews from critics attending the shows. Jill blended a mixed sound of R&B, soul-funk, Hip-Hop and poetry, while delivering her hits "Golden", "A Long Walk", "The Way" and the 2005 Grammy Award winning song, "Cross My Mind".

Opening acts
 Common 
 Raphael Saadiq (select dates)

Set list
"Jilltro" (Intro Suite)
"Warm Up"/"It's Love" (Mashup Mix)
"Golden" (Remix)
"A Long Walk"
"Exclusively"
"Gettin' In the Way"
"He Loves Me (Lyzel In E Flat)"
"Talk To Me"
"Cross My Mind"
"Bedda At Home" (Acapella)
"Whatever"
"Can't Explain (42nd Street Happenstance)"
"The Fact Is (I Need You)"
"One Is The Magic #"
"Slowly Surely"
"Not Like Crazy"
"The Way"

Notes

On select dates of the tour, opening act hip-hop star Common would ask Scott to appear on stage to perform their r&b/funk infused dance duet, "I Am Music" from his Platinum selling album, Like Water for Chocolate.

Tour dates

References

External links
jillscott.com-big beautiful tour arrives. 2005
jillscott.com-tour hits d.c. with common. 2005

Jill Scott (singer) concert tours
2005 concert tours